Second Lieutenant Bernard Pitt (19 June 1882 – 30 April 1916) was a British teacher, army officer and poet.  He attended Borough Road College from 1901 to 1903 to train as a teacher and remained at the institution to study for degrees in languages and literature.  Pitt taught at the King's School in Kew, Sir Joseph Williamson's Mathematical School in Rochester, Kent, and Coopers' Company School in Bow, London.  From 1912 he taught a degree-level course in English literature at the Working Men's College in St Pancras.  Pitt began a study of Anglo-Saxon literature in 1914 but left this to join the British Army and fight in the First World War.

Pitt served briefly with the Volunteer Training Corps before being commissioned into the Border Regiment.  He served with them in France before being detached to the 47th Trench Mortar Battery. He was killed in action while directing the fire of his battery near Arras.  After his death, a collection of his letters and poetry written on the Western Front was published and a colleague completed and published the work on Anglo-Saxon literature.

Early life and career 
Pitt was born on 19 June 1882 to Abraham Robert Pitt and his wife, Annie. He studied at Borough Road College, a teaching college on Borough Road, Southwark, between 1901 and 1903. The college's records state that Pitt's attitude to study was "not very satisfactory", though he graduated with a class 1 teachers certificate and excelled in chemistry, physiology and agriculture.  Pitt afterwards remained at the college and received a Bachelor of Arts degree in languages and, in 1911, a Master of Arts degree in literature, both accredited by the University of London. Pitt married Florence Mary and had four children.

Pitt became a master (teacher) at the King's School in Kew, Sir Joseph Williamson's Mathematical School in Rochester, Kent and Coopers' Company School in Bow, London. From 1912 he additionally taught English literature at the Working Men's College in St Pancras, London. His classes at the college were honours degree-level courses of three years' duration. Pitt's students' essays were compared favourably by Arthur Smith of Balliol College to the work done at the University of Oxford.

In the winter of 1914/15, Pitt worked with Alfred J. Wyatt on a review of Anglo-Saxon literature. Before the conclusion of the work, Pitt decided to join the British Army, noting at the time that "all is naught compared with the war". The Anglo-Saxon study was completed by Wyatt and published as An Anglo-Saxon Reader in 1919.

First World War 
Pitt initially joined the Volunteer Training Corps but later joined the main British Army. He was commissioned as a second lieutenant into the Border Regiment on 1 April 1915. He served with the regiment's 10th (Reserve) Battalion, part of Kitchener's Army. Pitt was deployed to France in December 1915, serving initially near Béthune. He described seeing heavy fighting and being recommended for the Military Cross but was granted the lower honour of a mention in despatches instead.

Pitt was attached to the 47th Trench Mortar Battery from February 1916. Pitt was killed in action on 30 April 1916 near Arras. He had been observing the fall of shells from his battery and correcting their fire when a German mine exploded under his position. Unusually for a time when next of kin were given sanitised versions of their loved ones' deaths, Pitt's widow, who was living in Hounslow, was told that his body was destroyed by the explosion and no trace of him could be found. Pitt's brigadier-general described him as the "embodiment of dash and pluck... whenever the Germans appeared to be getting particularly annoyed, the men would say 'oh, it's that little trench mortar officer at them with his guns'". At the time of Pitt's death, he was about to be appointed as a staff officer. His formal transfer to the General List for service with the trench mortar battery came on 30 May 1916. He is named on the Arras Memorial and the  Working Men's College named a room after him.

Pitt was a prolific letter writer and poet during his time on the front; these were collected and published after his death. His letters have been described as varying between being as idealistic as Rupert Brooke and as resentful of the war as Siegfried Sassoon. Two days before his death, Pitt had enjoyed a 24-hour rest period and wrote home while sitting under a walnut tree near a ruined village, noting the beauty of the blossoming fruit trees, flowers and wildlife.

Works

References

External links 
 

1882 births
1916 deaths
Border Regiment officers
British Army personnel of World War I
British military personnel killed in World War I
English World War I poets